Eileen Christine Desmond (29 December 1932 – 6 January 2005) was an Irish Labour Party politician who served as Minister for Health and Minister for Social Welfare from 1981 to 1982. She served as a Teachta Dála (TD) from 1965 to 1969, 1973 to 1981 and 1981 to 1987. She served as a Member of the European Parliament (MEP) for the Munster constituency from 1979 to 1981. She was a Senator for the Industrial and Commercial Panel from 1969 to 1973.

Early life
She was born in Kinsale, County Cork, and educated locally at the Convent of Mercy in Kinsale, where she was one of only two girls in her class to sit the Leaving Certificate examination. Before entering politics she worked as a civil servant with the Department of Posts and Telegraphs. She married Dan Desmond in 1955, a Labour TD for Cork from 1948 to 1964, and they had two daughters.

Politics
Desmond was elected to Dáil Éireann in a by-election on 10 March 1965, caused by the death of her husband Dan Desmond. Her victory in the Cork Mid constituency led Taoiseach Seán Lemass to dissolve the 17th Dáil, before she could assume her seat, and call a general election. She was elected for the second time in a year, but lost her seat at the 1969 general election. However, Desmond was then elected to the 12th Seanad on the Industrial and Commercial Panel, where she served until her re-election to the 20th Dáil following the 1973 general election. She supported the unsuccessful Contraceptives Bill in 1974.

She was elected to the European Parliament at the 1979 European Parliament election for the Munster constituency. However, her time in Europe was short-lived, as she returned to domestic politics when she was offered a position as Minister and the chance to impact upon national legislation. At the 1981 general election she switched her constituency to Cork South-Central. A Fine Gael–Labour Party coalition came to power and Desmond was appointed Minister for Health and for Social Welfare.

Desmond was only the third woman to be appointed to cabinet since the foundation of the state in 1922, and the first in a Fine Gael-Labour Party cabinet. Desmond was the only woman in that short-lived coalition Cabinet. She created the National Combat Poverty Agency, which addressed inequality. She achieved a 25% increase in social welfare allowance, a level never achieved before. However, the budget was defeated on 27 January 1982, leading to the dissolution of the 22nd Dáil, so the increases never came into effect.

Desmond left politics in 1987 for health reasons, and failed to obtain a seat in 1989. She died in 2005.

References

External links

 

 

1932 births
2005 deaths
Labour Party (Ireland) MEPs
Labour Party (Ireland) TDs
Labour Party (Ireland) senators
MEPs for the Republic of Ireland 1979–1984
Members of the 12th Seanad
20th-century women members of Seanad Éireann
Members of the 17th Dáil
Members of the 18th Dáil
Members of the 20th Dáil
Members of the 21st Dáil
Members of the 22nd Dáil
Members of the 23rd Dáil
Members of the 24th Dáil
20th-century women Teachtaí Dála
Ministers for Health (Ireland)
Ministers for Social Affairs (Ireland)
People from Kinsale
Politicians from County Cork
Spouses of Irish politicians
20th-century women MEPs for the Republic of Ireland
Women government ministers of the Republic of Ireland